SV Allerheiligen is an Austrian association football club from Allerheiligen. The club was founded in 1967.

References

External links
Official website 

Association football clubs established in 1967
Allerheiligen, USV
1967 establishments in Austria